Franco Malagueño (born 10 October 1998) is an Argentine professional footballer who plays as a right-back for Alvarado.

Career
Malagueño started out with Talleres. Frank Darío Kudelka was the manager who promoted Malagueño into the club's senior team, with his opening inclusion in a matchday squad occurring on 26 August 2017 during a 5–2 victory over Lanús. He was an unused substitute for that fixture, as he was a further eight times in the 2017–18 Primera División; midway through that season, Malagueño played for Talleres at the 2018 U-20 Copa Libertadores. His professional bow eventually arrived in February 2019, when the defender featured for the full ninety minutes of a draw away to Atlético Tucumán.

Career statistics
.

References

External links

1998 births
Living people
Footballers from Córdoba, Argentina
Argentine footballers
Association football defenders
Argentine Primera División players
Primera Nacional players
Talleres de Córdoba footballers
Club Atlético Alvarado players